Girls Town is the soundtrack to the 1996 film, Girls Town. It was released on August 20, 1996 through Mercury Records and was made up of half hip hop and half alternative rock, each song performed by female artists.

Track listing
"Sista" (Tyte)     
"And I Say" (Suga)     
"Somma Time Man" (Salt-n-Pepa)     
"I Can't Take No More" (Yo-Yo)     
"The Path" (Nefertiti)     
"Somedays" (Neneh Cherry)     
"Biggest Part of Me" (Bahamadia)     
"Strongman" (Luscious Jackson)    
"Gorecki" (Lamb)     
"Maniac" (PJ Harvey)     
"Thin Line" (Roxanne Shanté)     
"U.N.I.T.Y." (Queen Latifah)  
1990s film soundtrack albums
Hip hop soundtracks
1996 soundtrack albums
Mercury Records soundtracks
Alternative rock soundtracks